The Alchemy of Desire is a 2006 novel by Tarun Tejpal. It was shortlisted for the Prix Femina and won France's Le Prix Mille Pages for Best Foreign Literary Fiction.

References

External links
 Author Website

2006 novels
Indian English-language novels
2006 Indian novels
2006 debut novels